William Barrow (or Barrowe; died 1429) was a Bishop of Bangor and a Bishop of Carlisle.

Barrow served three times as Chancellor of the University of Oxford during 1413–17.

Barrow was selected as Bishop of Bangor on 15 February 1418, and consecrated after 13 October 1419. He was transferred from Bangor to Carlisle on 19 April 1423. He died on 4 September 1429.

Citations

References
 
 

Year of birth unknown
1429 deaths
Chancellors of the University of Oxford
Bishops of Bangor
Bishops of Carlisle
15th-century English Roman Catholic bishops